The women's lightweight 60 kg boxing event at the 2015 European Games in Baku was held from 21 to 27 June at the Baku Crystal Hall.

Results

References

External links

Women 60
2015 in women's boxing